Mara Hobel (born June 18, 1971) is an American actress. She is best known for her portrayal of young Christina Crawford in the film Mommie Dearest, starring Faye Dunaway. She garnered 2 Razzie nominations for her performance. She also portrayed the crazed tap-dancing daughter Gay in the legendary Broadway bomb, Moose Murders, which opened and closed on the same night in 1983.

Hobel played the recurring character Charlotte Tilden for one season on the television series Roseanne from 1992 to 1993. Her film work includes Personal Velocity: Three Portraits and Broadway Damage. In 2019, she appeared on the television series Blue Bloods.

Hobel currently teaches acting classes for children at Rising Star Productions. She is married to Mark Furrer. Together they have two sons and a daughter.

Filmography
 Mommie Dearest (1981) – Christina Crawford – nominated for Golden Raspberry Award for Worst Supporting Actress 
 The Hand (1981) – Lizzie
 Broadway Damage (1997) – Cynthia
 Claire Makes It Big (1999) – Claire
 Personal Velocity (2002) – Fay
 Kinsey (2004) – Student #2
 The Happening (2008) – Woman with Hands Over Ears

Television
 Sorrows of Gin (1979) – Amy
 Family of Strangers (1980, 1 episode) – Roseanne
 CBS Children's Mystery Theater (1983, 1 episode) – Theodora
 The Get Along Gang (1984) – Dotty Dog (voice)
 Doing Life (1986, 1 episode) – Rachel Rosenberg
 Law & Order (1992, 1 episode) – Ellen
 Summer Stories (1992, 3 episodes) – Sarah
 Roseanne (1992–1993, 5 episodes) – Charlotte Tilden
 My So-Called Life (1994, 1 episode)
 Third Watch (2002, 1 episode) – Margo
 The Jury (2004, 1 episode) – Marianne Zancanaro
 Law & Order: Criminal Intent (2004, 1 episode) – April Callaway

Theater
  In My Father's Eyes
  Moose Murders
  Rude Times

Training
Drama: The American Academy of Dramatic Arts, NY
Voice: The Voice Workshop, Liz Sabine and Louis David, NY and CA
Dance: Phil Black and Studio II, NY

External links
 

1971 births
Living people
American film actresses
American television actresses
21st-century American women